Daniel Kyriakides (born 21 March 1995) is a Welsh international field hockey player who plays as a midfielder or defender for Wales and Great Britain.

James Kyriakides is his elder brother.

Club career
Kyriakides plays club hockey in the Men's England Hockey League Premier Division for Hampstead & Westminster, whom he joined from Cardiff & Met.
He has also played in the Bundesliga for Crefelder HTC and for Reading and Swansea City HC.

International career
He made his senior GB debut against India on 29 April 2017.

He represented Wales in the 2014 Commonwealth Games & 2018 Commonwealth games.

References

External links
 
 
 

1995 births
Living people
Welsh male field hockey players
British male field hockey players
Male field hockey defenders
Male field hockey midfielders
Field hockey players at the 2014 Commonwealth Games
Commonwealth Games competitors for Wales
Hampstead & Westminster Hockey Club players
Reading Hockey Club players
Men's England Hockey League players
Expatriate field hockey players
Welsh expatriate sportspeople in Germany
2023 Men's FIH Hockey World Cup players